Panola County Courthouse may refer to:

Panola County Courthouse (Batesville, Mississippi)
Panola County Courthouse (Sardis, Mississippi)
Panola County Courthouse (Texas), Carthage, Texas